Edward Brown (7 March 1891 – 12 March 1949) was an Australian cricketer. He played one first-class match for New South Wales in 1920/21.

See also
 List of New South Wales representative cricketers

References

External links
 

1891 births
1949 deaths
Australian cricketers
New South Wales cricketers
Cricketers from Newcastle, New South Wales